Pape Maly Diamanka (born 10 January 1990) is a Senegalese professional footballer who plays for Lleida Esportiu as a central midfielder.

He spent most of his career in Spain after arriving in the country in 2010, starting out at Rayo Vallecano.

Club career
Born in Dakar, Diamanka began his career with local US Gorée. In February 2010 he joined Spanish club Rayo Vallecano, being assigned to the reserves in the Tercera División and being a regular in his first full season, starting 23 games and completing 20 as the Madrid outskirts team retained their Segunda División B status.

On 13 June 2011, Diamanka renewed his contract with a €6 million buyout clause, also being promoted to the main squad for the 2011–12 campaign. He spent several months on the sidelines due to bureaucratic problems.

Diamanka made his competitive debut on 8 January 2012, playing 32 minutes as a substitute in the 2–1 La Liga home win against Sevilla FC. On 23 August, he was loaned to Norway's Vålerenga Fotball for one season with the option for a permanent deal.

After being released by Rayo, Diamanka moved to Salamanca AC but, after the club failed to register, he joined Sestao River Club on 26 August 2013. On 18 July of the following year he signed for CD Leganés, newly promoted to the Segunda División.

Diamanka scored his first professional goal on 21 September 2014, his team's first in a 2–2 home draw against Racing de Santander. On 29 June 2015, he severed his ties and agreed to a three-year deal at Real Zaragoza also in the second tier.

On 22 July 2016, after 15 starts and 1,334 minutes of action, Diamanka terminated his contract and signed a two-year deal with UD Almería of the same league the same day. On 10 August 2017, he moved to fellow second-division CD Numancia as a free agent. He scored a career-best nine goals in 2018–19.

On 5 July 2019, Diamanka signed a three-year contract with Girona FC, recently relegated to division two. On 29 September of the following year, he was loaned to Albacete Balompié in the same tier; in August 2021, he terminated his link to the former.

Diamanka joined UD Logroñés of the newly-formed Primera División RFEF in January 2022.

International career
Diamanka represented Senegal at various youth levels. In August 2011, he was called up by the senior team for a friendly with Morocco in Dakar, but eventually did not make his debut.

Career statistics

References

External links

1990 births
Living people
Footballers from Dakar
Senegalese footballers
Association football midfielders
La Liga players
Segunda División players
Segunda División B players
Tercera División players
Primera Federación players
Rayo Vallecano B players
Rayo Vallecano players
Sestao River footballers
CD Leganés players
Real Zaragoza players
UD Almería players
CD Numancia players
Girona FC players
Albacete Balompié players
UD Logroñés players
Lleida Esportiu footballers
Eliteserien players
Vålerenga Fotball players
Senegal A' international footballers
2009 African Nations Championship players
2011 CAF U-23 Championship players
Senegalese expatriate footballers
Expatriate footballers in Spain
Expatriate footballers in Norway
Senegalese expatriate sportspeople in Spain
Senegalese expatriate sportspeople in Norway